Ooperipatellus nickmayeri is a species of oviparous velvet worm in the family Peripatopsidae. This species is larger than any other in its genus (exceeding 60 mm in females; 30 mm in males); they can be more than twice as long as other Ooperipatellus species. These velvet worms have 14 pairs of legs, with the last pair reduced in size. This species varies in color from blue to predominantly orange-brown, with a light blue ventral surface. They are found in rotting logs and leaf litter. The type locality is in Tasmania.

References 

Onychophorans of Australasia
Onychophoran species
Animals described in 2017